Tyner may refer to:

Places
In the United States:
 Tyner, Indiana
 Tyner, Kansas
 Tyner, Kentucky
 Tyner, a hamlet near the east town line of Smithville, New York on County Road 3, east of Smithville Center
 Tyner, North Carolina
 Tyner, Tennessee, a populated place in Hamilton County, Tennessee
 Tyner, West Virginia

People
 Charles Tyner (1925–2017), American actor
 Chuck Tyner, former goalie for the Toronto Professional Hockey Club
 James Noble Tyner (1826–1904), postmaster general from 1876 to 1877
 Jarvis Tyner (born 1941), executive vice chair of the Communist Party USA
 Jason Tyner (born 1977), Major League Baseball outfielder
 John Tyner, former guitarist for Mk Ultra
 John Tyner, software engineer and blogger known for refusing to cave in to TSA demands
 Lanardo Tyner (born 1975), American boxer
 Matt Tyner (born 1958), American baseball player and coach
 McCoy Tyner (1938–2020), American jazz pianist
 Mitch Tyner, trial lawyer and candidate in the Mississippi gubernatorial election, 2003
 Richard Tyner (1877–1958), Anglican bishop
 Rob Tyner (1944–1991), lead singer for the American hard rock band MC5
 Roy Tyner (1934–1989), NASCAR driver
 Rudolph Tyner, death row inmate killed by Donald Henry Gaskins
 Scott Tyner (born 1972), former NFL punter for the Atlanta Falcons
 Thomas Tyner (born 1994), American college football player
 William Tyner (1872–1954), Australian politician